Agricultural science (or agriscience for short) is a broad multidisciplinary field of biology that encompasses the parts of exact, natural, economic and social sciences that are used in the practice and understanding of agriculture. Professionals of the agricultural science are called agricultural scientists or agriculturists.

History

In the 18th century, Johann Friedrich Mayer conducted experiments on the use of gypsum (hydrated calcium sulphate) as a fertilizer.

In 1843, John Bennet Lawes and Joseph Henry Gilbert began a set of long-term field experiments at Rothamsted Research in England, some of which are still running as of 2018.

In the United States, a scientific revolution in agriculture began with the Hatch Act of 1887, which used the term "agricultural science". The Hatch Act was driven by farmers' interest in knowing the constituents of early artificial fertilizer. The Smith–Hughes Act of 1917 shifted agricultural education back to its vocational roots, but the scientific foundation had been built. For the next 44 years after 1906, federal expenditures on agricultural research in the United States outpaced private expenditures.

Prominent agricultural scientists

 Wilbur Olin Atwater
 Robert Bakewell
 Norman Borlaug
 Luther Burbank
 George Washington Carver
 Carl Henry Clerk
 George C. Clerk
 René Dumont
 Sir Albert Howard
 Kailas Nath Kaul
Thomas Lecky
 Justus von Liebig
 Jay Laurence Lush
 Gregor Mendel
 Louis Pasteur
 M. S. Swaminathan
 Jethro Tull
 Artturi Ilmari Virtanen
 Sewall Wright

Fields or related disciplines

Scope
Agriculture, agricultural science, and agronomy are often confused. However, they cover different concepts:
Agriculture is the set of activities that transform the environment for the production of animals and plants for human use. Agriculture concerns techniques, including the application of agronomic research.
Agronomy is research and development related to studying and improving plant-based crops.

Soil forming factors and soil degradation
Agricultural sciences include research and development on:
 Improving agricultural productivity in terms of quantity and quality (e.g., selection of drought-resistant crops and animals, development of new pesticides, yield-sensing technologies, simulation models of crop growth, in-vitro cell culture techniques)
 Minimizing the effects of pests (weeds, insects, pathogens, mollusks, nematodes) on crop or animal production systems.
 Transformation of primary products into end-consumer products (e.g., production, preservation, and packaging of dairy products)
 Prevention and correction of adverse environmental effects (e.g., soil degradation, waste management, bioremediation)
 Theoretical production ecology, relating to crop production modeling
 Traditional agricultural systems, sometimes termed subsistence agriculture, which feed most of the poorest people in the world.  These systems are of interest as they sometimes retain a level of integration with natural ecological systems greater than that of industrial agriculture, which may be more sustainable than some modern agricultural systems.
 Food production and demand on a global basis, with special attention paid to the major producers, such as China, India, Brazil, the US and the EU.
 Various sciences relating to agricultural resources and the environment (e.g. soil science, agroclimatology); biology of agricultural crops and animals (e.g. crop science, animal science and their included sciences, e.g. ruminant nutrition, farm animal welfare); such fields as agricultural economics and rural sociology; various disciplines encompassed in agricultural engineering.

See also
 Agricultural Research Council
 Agricultural sciences basic topics
 Agriculture ministry
 Agroecology
 American Society of Agronomy
 Genomics of domestication
 History of agricultural science
 Institute of Food and Agricultural Sciences
 International Assessment of Agricultural Science and Technology for Development
 International Food Policy Research Institute, IFPRI
 List of agriculture topics
 National FFA Organization
 Research Institute of Crop Production (RICP) (in the Czech Republic)
 University of Agricultural Sciences

References

Further reading
Agricultural Research, Livelihoods, and Poverty: Studies of Economic and Social Impacts in Six Countries Edited by Michelle Adato and Ruth Meinzen-Dick (2007), Johns Hopkins University Press Food Policy Report
Claude Bourguignon, Regenerating the Soil: From Agronomy to Agrology, Other India Press, 2005
Pimentel David, Pimentel Marcia, Computer les kilocalories, Cérès, n. 59, sept-oct. 1977
Russell E. Walter, Soil conditions and plant growth, Longman group, London, New York 1973
 
Saltini Antonio, Storia delle scienze agrarie, 4 vols, Bologna 1984–89, 
Vavilov Nicolai I. (Starr Chester K. editor), The Origin, Variation, Immunity and Breeding of Cultivated Plants. Selected Writings, in Chronica botanica, 13: 1–6, Waltham, Mass., 1949–50
Vavilov Nicolai I., World Resources of Cereals, Leguminous Seed Crops and Flax, Academy of Sciences of Urss, National Science Foundation, Washington, Israel Program for Scientific Translations, Jerusalem 1960
Winogradsky Serge, Microbiologie du sol. Problèmes et methodes. Cinquante ans de recherches, Masson & c.ie, Paris 1949

External links

Consultative Group on International Agricultural Research (CGIAR)
Agricultural Research Service
Indian Council of Agricultural Research
International Institute of Tropical Agriculture
International Livestock Research Institute
The National Agricultural Library (NAL) - The most comprehensive agricultural library in the world.
Crop Science Society of America
American Society of Agronomy
Soil Science Society of America
Agricultural Science Researchers, Jobs and Discussions
Information System for Agriculture and Food Research
NMSU Department of Entomology Plant Pathology and Weed Science